There are over 20,000 Grade II* listed buildings in England. This page is a list of these buildings in the district of Stratford-on-Avon in Warwickshire.

Stratford-on-Avon

|}

Notes

External links

Lists of listed buildings in Warwickshire
 
Grade II* listed buildings in Stratford-on-Avon (district)